Chesterfield County may refer to:

Places

Two counties in the United States:
 Chesterfield County, South Carolina 
 Chesterfield County, Virginia

Ships
USS Chesterfield County (LST-551), a United States Navy tank landing ship in commission from 1944 to 1955 as USS LST-551 and in the late 1960s as USS Chesterfield County